Koskinen is a surname originating in Finland (in Finnish, it means "small rapids"), where it is the ninth most common surname. Notable people with the surname include:

Aarno Yrjö-Koskinen (1885–1951), Finnish politician, ambassador and freiherr
Harri Koskinen (born 1970), Finnish designer
Heikki Koskinen (born 1930), Finnish chess master
Jari Koskinen (born 1960), Finnish politician, Minister for Agriculture and Forestry of Finland
Johannes Koskinen (born 1954), Finnish politician (M.P., Minister of Justice)
John Koskinen (born 1939), American former U.S. Commissioner of Internal Revenue and former president of the U.S. Soccer Foundation
Joonas Koskinen, Finnish ice hockey player
Jukka Koskinen, Finnish musician (bassist for Norther, Wintersun)
Jukka Koskinen (footballer) (born 1972), Finnish football (soccer) player
Kalle Koskinen (born 1972), Finnish ice hockey player
Kerkko Koskinen (born 1973), Finnish musician
Lennart Koskinen (born 1944), clergyman in the Church of Sweden, serving as bishop in Visby
Mikko Koskinen (born 1988), Finnish hockey player for the Edmonton Oilers of the National Hockey League
Pasi Koskinen (born 1972), Finnish vocalist (Amorphis)
Paul Koskinen (born 1964), Finnish abstract artist
Petri Koskinen (born 1983), Finnish ice hockey player
Riina Koskinen (born 1997), Finnish squash player
Rolf Koskinen (1939–2010), Finnish orienteering competitor, European champion
Sampo Koskinen (born 1979), Finnish football (soccer) player
Sauli Koskinen (born 1985), a Finnish TV/radio personality and entertainment reporter
Tapio Koskinen (born 1953), Finnish ice hockey player
Yrjö Sakari Yrjö-Koskinen (1830–1903), Finnish politician (senator, Finnish Party), professor, historian

See also
Koskinen, a Finnish crime drama television series
Koskinen Stadium, a lacrosse and soccer stadium on the campus of Duke University, named for John Koskinen

References

Finnish-language surnames